General Keller may refer to:

Fyodor Eduardovich Keller (1850–1904), Imperial Russian Army lieutenant general
Fyodor Arturovich Keller (1857–1918), Imperial Russian Army general of the cavalry
Alfred Keller (1882–1974), German Luftwaffe general
Robert P. Keller (1920–2010), U.S. Marine Corps lieutenant general
Rod Keller (1900–1954), Canadian Army major general